{{Automatic taxobox
| fossil_range = 
| image =
| image_caption = Acondylacanthus jaekeli spines from the Devonian
| taxon = Acondylacanthus
| authority = St. John & Worthen, 1875
| subdivision_ranks = Species
| subdivision = *A. gracilis
A. nuperus
A. jaekeli
A. colei
A. attenuatus
A. tenuistriatus
A. tuberculatus
A. mudgianusA. distansA. aeuicostatusA. gracillimusA. browni}}Acondylacanthus is an extinct genus of Euselachian shark from the Paleozoic era. The type species is A. gracilis. Most species are known from the Carboniferous of America and the British isles. A. jaekeli'' is known from the upper Frasnian of Germany and the Upper Famennian of Russia. This genus is based entirely upon isolated dorsal fin spines, and thus may later be found synonymous with tooth-based genera. Many species have been ascribed to this genus, though there has been some confusion with Ctenachanthus. This genus is in need of review and research.

References

Elasmobranchii
Prehistoric shark genera